Shaun Raubenheimer (born 10 November 1983) is a former South African rugby union player for the  in the Currie Cup and the Rugby Challenge.

Career

Youth

He represented his local side  at youth level until 2003. He then joined the SAPS College, which led to his inclusion in the South African Police team in 2006 and the South African Forces team in 2007.

Provincial career

He quickly established himself as a first team regular, making fifteen appearances in the 2008 Vodacom and Currie Cup competitions.

A short spell at the  followed in 2011 before he returned to the  once more in 2012.

Raubenheimer retired from professional rugby during the 2014 Currie Cup First Division due to other work commitments, having made 101 first class appearances and scoring 30 tries during his career.

Representative rugby

He was included in a South African Barbarians (South) team that faced England during the 2012 mid-year rugby test series.

References

South African rugby union players
Living people
1983 births
People from George, South Africa
Border Bulldogs players
SWD Eagles players
Griffons (rugby union) players
Rugby union flankers
Rugby union players from the Western Cape